The name Odette has been used for nine tropical cyclones worldwide.

In the Atlantic Ocean:
 Tropical Storm Odette (2003), an off-season storm that formed near the coast of Panama and made landfall in the Dominican Republic.
 Tropical Storm Odette (2021), a weak, short-lived storm that formed off the Mid-Atlantic U.S. coast and moved out to sea.

In the Australian Region:
 Cyclone Odette (1985), formed off the coast of Queensland and moved across the Coral Sea.
 Tropical Low Odette (2007), formed in the Coral Sea, causing heavy swell along the coast of Queensland.
 Cyclone Odette (2021), formed off the coast of Western Australia and was soon fully absorbed into the circulation of Cyclone Seroja.

In the South-West Indian Ocean:
 Tropical Storm Odette (1971), a rare off-season tropical storm in the South-West Indian Ocean. 

In the Western Pacific:

The name replaced Ondoy on the PAGASA naming list.
 Typhoon Usagi (2013) (T1319, 17W, Odette), a  Category 4-equivalent super typhoon that affected parts of the Philippines, Taiwan, and China.
 Typhoon Khanun (2017) (T1720, 24W, Odette)
 Typhoon Rai (2021) (T2122, 28W, Odette), a Category 5-equivalent super typhoon that caused severe and widespread damage in the Southern Philippines.

Odette was retired from use in the Philippine area of responsibility following the 2021 Pacific typhoon season and will be replaced with Opong in 2025.

References

Atlantic hurricane set index articles
Pacific typhoon set index articles
Australian region cyclone set index articles